Shannon Cooke (born 2 February 2000) is an English footballer who plays as a defender for WSL Club West Ham United

Club career
Cooke made her Arsenal debut in the FA Women's Super League in the penultimate match of the 2017–18 season. She came on in the 87th minute, replacing goalscorer Beth Mead in a 2–0 win over Sunderland.

References

External links

 LSU bio

2000 births
Living people
English women's footballers
Women's Super League players
Arsenal W.F.C. players
FA Women's National League players
Women's association football defenders
LSU Tigers women's soccer players